The gralla, also known as grall de pastor, xaramita or xirimita, is a traditional Catalan double reed instrument in the shawm family classified in the group 422.112 in the Hornbostel-Sachs system. Like the dolçaina from Valencia – a very similar instrument that many experts consider a variety of the gralla –. The gralla comes from the ancient xeremia a medieval instrument largely used until the Baroque. Probably, the name of the instrument comes from its strident sound similar to the sound of a Jackdaw native to Catalonia and northern Spain and also called 'Gralla' in Catalan.

This traditional instrument is used during the construction and dismantling of human towers or castells and other traditional festivities. it is usually played with the timbal, a percussion instrument similar to a drum. The traditional gralla melody used in castells, called the toc de castells, serves to advise the castellers within the tower what stage of the construction their colleagues have reached, as they are unable to see this.

The gralla regains its popularity in the end of 1970s.

Types
There are two types of gralla, the seca(dry) and the dolça, (sweet). Both can be characterised by their sound: the gralla seca (dry) has a harsher or strident sound while the gralla dolça (sweet) has metal keys that increase its register.

Components

 Cap: in the top of the instrument is where the tudell is inserted with the canya.
 Tub: the part between the tudell and the canya or inxa.
 Tudell: a conic tube made of metal where the canya is inserted.
 Canya o inxa: Formed by two identical reeds made of wood but independent, tied together by a wire.
 Cos: the central part of the instrument. A conical wood tube with six gaps in the front side and one in the back.
 Campana: the final part that act like an amplifier of the sound and has two gaps in the sides. It is usually covered with metal.

References

External links 

Grallers.cat El web de la gralla i el món graller
Partitures per a gralla 
Més partitures per a gralla
Encara més partitures per a gralla

Catalan musical instruments
Oboes